Domenico Quaglio the Younger (January 1, 1787 – April 9, 1837) was a German painter, engraver, stage designer, and architect. He was the second son of Giuseppe Quaglio and part of the large Quaglio pedigree of Italian artists involved in architecture, indoor fresco decoration, and scenography for the court theaters. He was known as a landscape and architectural painter/decorator, including quadratura.

He was born in Munich. He was taught perspective and scene-painting by his father, and engraving by Mettenleiter and Karl Hess. In 1819 he resigned his post as scene-painter, and occupied himself only with architecture, for which he obtained subjects in the Netherlands, Italy, France, and England. As architect in charge, Domenico Quaglio was responsible for the neogothic style of the exterior design of Hohenschwangau Castle, summer and hunting residence of King Maximilian II of Bavaria, son of King Ludwig I of Bavaria and father of King Ludwig II. Quaglio died at Hohenschwangau in 1837. He engraved twelve plates of'Architectural Monuments’‘, and lithographed thirty Remarkable German Buildings of the Middle Ages.

References

1787 births
1837 deaths
Architects from Munich
Architects of the Bavarian court
19th-century German painters
German male painters
19th-century German architects
German scenic designers
19th-century German male artists